Sumy operational-tactical group, or Sumy operations group, is a formation of the Ukrainian Ground Forces in Ukraine. Its headquarters is located in Sumy, and is responsible for the defense of Sumy Oblast, Poltava Oblast, Cherkasy Oblast, and parts of the Kharkiv Oblast. Its commander is Major General Oleksandr Nesterenko and was formed in April 2022 during the Russian invasion of Ukraine.

History 
When the 2022 invasion of Ukraine by Russia commenced, the Ukrainian city of Sumy was only defended by one airmobile platoon. As a result, civilians took up arms from an army warehouse and defended the city for weeks as the Sumy territorial defense forces. Once the Ukrainian Army advanced with two separate battalions along the border of the Chernihiv Oblast and Sumy Oblast, they received a directive to create the Sumy tactical group which was disbanded and reformed on April 14 as the Sumy operational-tactical group by order of the Ukrainian command. Since then, the Sumy operational-tactical group has been training and creating volunteer formations, while establishing further defenses.

Structure 
The Sumy operational-tactical group has operational command of regional ground force units in Sumy, Poltava, Cherkasy, and parts of Kharkiv. The tactical group includes territorial defense brigades, rifle battalions, and other units of the Ukrainian Armed Forces alongside units of the State Border Guard Service, National Police, special security services, and volunteer formations and operate as one formation.

 Sumy Operational-Tactical Group, Sumy
15th Separate Rifle Battalion
116th Territorial Defense Brigade
117th Territorial Defense Brigade
150th Separate Infantry Battalion
State Border Guard units
National Police units
Special security service units

Commanders 
 Major General Oleksandr Nesterenko (April 2022 - present)

References 

Military units and formations of Ukraine
Sumy
Sumy